Toothsayer is an EP album by Canadian Inuk musician Tanya Tagaq. It was released on March 1, 2019 through Six Shooter Records.

Track listing

References

2019 EPs
Tanya Tagaq albums
Six Shooter Records EPs
Post-rock EPs
Post-rock albums by Canadian artists